John P. Lee  was an American football player and coach.  He was the head football coach at Fordham University in 1891 and 1893, compiling a record of 5–2–1.  He led Fordham to the program's first undefeated season, a 4–0 campaign in 1893.

Head coaching record

References

Year of birth missing
Year of death missing
19th-century players of American football
Fordham Rams football coaches
Harvard Crimson football players